Arun Pathak has been an adviser to the Governor of Bihar since 19 May 2005. The President's rule was imposed there in March, 2005.  He retired from the Indian Administrative Service in 1993. He was the chief secretary of Bihar twice. According to rediff.com, he was known for his honest image.

In May 2005, he was accused of being a loyalist of Lalu Prasad Yadav by The Times of India.

References

External links
 "Arun Pathak appointed Bihar governor advisor" - rediff.com article dated 8 March 2005

Indian civil servants
Year of birth missing (living people)
Living people
Bihari politicians